Ninoska Carolina Solís Quintana (born 26 February 1993) is a Nicaraguan footballer who plays as a forward for the Nicaragua women's national team.

International career
Solís capped for Nicaragua at senior level during the 2012 CONCACAF Women's Olympic Qualifying Tournament qualification, the 2013 Central American Games, two Central American and Caribbean Games editions (2014 and 2018) and the 2018 CONCACAF Women's Championship qualification.

References 

1993 births
Living people
Nicaraguan women's footballers
Women's association football forwards
Nicaragua women's international footballers
Central American Games silver medalists for Nicaragua
Central American Games medalists in football